Sergo Arseni Goglidze (Russian: Сергей (Серго) Арсеньевич Гоглидзе, Georgian: სერგო არსენის ძე გოგლიძე; 1901 – 23 December 1953) was a Soviet security officer, NKVD official and Colonel General of State Security.

Biography 
Born in Korta, a village near Kutaisi, Serghei (Sergo) Arsenievici (Arsentievici) Goglidze joined the Cheka in 1921. He served with GPU-NKVD border troops, rising through the ranks. In 1934 he was appointed People's Commissar of Internal Affairs of the Transcaucasian SFSR, and, from 1937, of the Georgian SSR. Goglidze was a close associate and friend of Lavrentiy Beria, who promoted him to high-level positions.

In 1941, he was appointed Plenipotentiary of the People's Commissar's Council in Moldavia (Romanian territory, occupied by the Soviet Union following the ultimatum of June 26, 1940, itself a direct consequence of the Ribbentrop-Molotov pact), and was put in charge of a major deportation. In July 1941, after the start of the war, he was moved to Khabarovsk, working as a chief of the Soviet security apparatus in the Far East.

In 1951, he was moved to the headquarters of the MGB in Moscow, serving as a Deputy Minister of State Security. Goglidze was in charge of the investigation of the Doctors' Plot.

In 1953, after the death of Stalin and downfall of Beria, he was arrested and shot (in Moscow, on 23 December 1953) together with a group of other NKVD officers close to Beria.

Notes and links 

 Н. В. Петров, К. В. Скоркин: [http://www.memo.ru/history/nkvd/kto/biogr/gb102.htmГоглидзе, Сергей Арсеньевич]. Кто руководил НКВД 1934–1941, Москва 1999. * http://www.hrono.ru/biograf/bio_g/goglidze_sa.php (rus.)
 http://www.knowbysight.info/GGG/02069.asp (rus.)

1901 births
1953 deaths
Cheka officers
NKVD officers
People from Kutais Governorate
Central Committee of the Communist Party of the Soviet Union candidate members
First convocation members of the Soviet of Nationalities
Second convocation members of the Soviet of the Union
Third convocation members of the Soviet of Nationalities
Communist Party of Georgia (Soviet Union) politicians
Generals from Georgia (country)
Soviet colonel generals
Soviet Georgian NKVD officials

Soviet Georgian generals
Commissars 2nd Class of State Security
Recipients of the Order of Lenin
Recipients of the Order of the Red Banner
Recipients of the Order of the Red Banner of Labour
Recipients of the Order of the Red Star
People from Georgia (country) executed by the Soviet Union
People of World War II from Georgia (country)